John W. Carr (January 1, 1887 – death date unknown) was an American Negro league first baseman between 1918 and 1920.

A native of Kentucky, Carr played for the Dayton Marcos in 1918 and again in 1920. In three recorded games, he was hitless with one walk in seven plate appearances.

References

External links
 and Seamheads

1887 births
Place of birth missing
Year of death missing
Place of death missing
Dayton Marcos players